Charles Ernest Young (26 October 1905 – 10 June 1980) was an Australian rules footballer who played with Melbourne in the Victorian Football League (VFL).

Notes

External links 

Charles Young's playing statistics from The VFA Project
Demonwiki profile

1905 births
Australian rules footballers from Victoria (Australia)
Melbourne Football Club players
Coburg Football Club players
Sandringham Football Club players
1980 deaths